William Burwell Sellers (born February 10, 1963) is an American lawyer and judge, who serves as an associate justice of the Supreme Court of Alabama.

Sellers was born and raised in Montgomery, Alabama. He completed a Bachelor of Arts degree at Hillsdale College in Hillsdale, Michigan in 1985, with majors in history and political economy. He then completed a Juris Doctor degree at the University of Alabama School of Law in 1988, and a Master of Laws degree in Taxation at New York University in 1989.

Sellers was in private practice in Montgomery, Alabama from 1989 to 2017, specializing in tax law and litigation. He was a partner with the prominent Montgomery law firm Balch & Bingham, where his work mainly involved litigation with the Internal Revenue Service and the Alabama Department of Revenue. He has been active in many community organizations, including the Rotary Club, United Way, and the YMCA, and received the President's Award for service in 2012 from the Alabama Bar Association.

In 2016, Sellers was a member of the electoral college, his 4th time to serve as a presidential elector from Alabama.

The Governor of Alabama, Kay Ivey, appointed Sellers as an associate justice on the Supreme Court of Alabama in May 2017, to replace Lyn Stuart, who had been elevated to chief justice. Sellers previously served as chair of Ivey's successful campaigns for Lieutenant Governor of Alabama in 2010 and 2014.

Sellers ran for a full term in 2018 and was unopposed. Sellers's campaign was endorsed by the Business Council of Alabama, Alabama Society of CPAs, the Alabama Farmers Federation, The Alabama New South Coalition and the Alabama Civil Justice Reform Committee. His current term expires in 2025.

Since his appointment, Sellers has written over 150 opinions

Justice Sellers writes monthly articles on the anniversary of historic events.

On January 16, 2023, Sellers administered the oath of office to Governor Kay Ivey.

In February 2023, Justice Sellers was endorsed by FarmPAC. Manufacture Alabama endorsed him in March of 2023

References

External links

1963 births
Living people
Justices of the Supreme Court of Alabama
University of Alabama School of Law alumni
Hillsdale College alumni
New York University alumni
Lawyers from Montgomery, Alabama
Alabama Republicans
20th-century American lawyers
21st-century American lawyers
21st-century American judges
Politicians from Montgomery, Alabama